Stamenković (Cyrillic script: Стаменковић) is a Serbian patronymic surname derived from a masculine given name Stamenko. It may refer to:

Dejan Stamenković (born 1983), footballer
Dejan Stamenković (born 1990), footballer
Ljubiša Stamenković (born 1964), football coach
Nenad Stamenković (born 1977), footballer
Predrag Stamenković (born 1977), footballer
Saša Stamenković (born 1985), football goalkeeper
Srboljub Stamenković (1956–1996), footballer

Serbian surnames
Patronymic surnames